USS Nimble may refer to the following ships of the United States Navy:

 , was a minesweeper commissioned in 1944 and transferred to Taiwan in 1948
 , was a minesweeper commissioned in 1955 and sold in 1981

United States Navy ship names